Texas 25 is a compilation album by Scottish rock band Texas, released on 16 February 2015. The album was released to celebrate the band's 25th anniversary and features eight reworked Texas tracks along with four new songs. A 2-disc deluxe edition of the album was also released, with disc 1 featuring the same track listing as the standard version of the album and disc 2 including the original versions of 15 of the band's biggest hits.

In 2016, it was awarded a gold certification from the Independent Music Companies Association, indicating sales of at least 75,000 copies throughout Europe.

Track listing

Single disc standard version
 "Start a Family"  (new song)
 "Black Eyed Boy" (Truth & Soul Mix)
 "Say What You Want" (Truth & Soul Mix)
 "Supafly Boy" (new song)
 "Halo" (Truth & Soul Mix)
 "Inner Smile" (Truth & Soul Mix)
 "The Conversation" (Truth & Soul Mix)
 "Say Goodbye" (new song)
 "When We Are Together" (Truth & Soul Mix)
 "Are You Ready" (new song)
 "I Don't Want a Lover" (Truth & Soul Mix)
 "Summer Son" (Truth & Soul Mix)

2-disc deluxe edition
CD1
 "Start a Family" ''
 "Black Eyed Boy" (Truth & Soul Mix)
 "Say What You Want" (Truth & Soul Mix)
 "Supafly Boy"
 "Halo" (Truth & Soul Mix)
 "Inner Smile" (Truth & Soul Mix)
 "The Conversation" (Truth & Soul Mix)
 "Say Goodbye" 
 "When We Are Together" (Truth & Soul Mix)
 "Are You Ready"
 "I Don't Want a Lover" (Truth & Soul Mix)
 "Summer Son" (Truth & Soul Mix)

CD2
 "I Don't Want a Lover" (from Southside)
 "Everyday Now" (from Southside)
 "Say What You Want" (from White on Blonde)
 "Halo" (from White on Blonde)
 "Black Eyed Boy" (from White on Blonde)
 "Put Your Arms Around Me" (from White on Blonde)
 "Summer Son" (from The Hush)
 "When We Are Together" (from The Hush)
 "In Our Lifetime" (from The Hush)
 "In Demand" (from The Greatest Hits)
 "Inner Smile" (from The Greatest Hits)
 "Sleep" (from Red Book)
 "Say What You Want (All Day, Every Day)" (featuring the Wu-Tang Clan) (non-album single)
 "The Conversation" (from The Conversation)
 "Detroit City" (from The Conversation)

Personnel
Adapted from AllMusic.

 Michael Bannister – keyboards, mixing
 Thomas Brenneck – guitar
 Julian Broad – cover photo
 Mike Buckley – baritone sax 
 Barrie Cadogan – guitar
 Eddie Campbell	– keyboards
 Alecia Chakour	– background vocals
 Collin Dupuis – mixing
 Tom Elmhirst – mixing
 Dave Guy – trumpet
 Joe Harrison – assistant engineer
 Vincent John – guitar, keyboards
 Johnny McElhone – bass guitar, mixing, producer
 Ally McErlaine – guitar
 Ross McFarlane – percussion
 Tony McGovern – guitar
 Leon Michels – additional production, guitar, keyboards, producer, tenor sax
 Nick Movshon – bass, drums
 Luke O'Malley – guitar
 Lenesha Randolph – background vocals
 Ray Mason – trombone
 Jeffrey Scott – additional production, engineer, producer
 Sharleen Spiteri – composer, guitar, vocals
 Homer Steinweiss – drums
 Texas – primary artist
 Joe Visciano – mixing assistant

Charts

Weekly charts

Year-end charts

Certifications

References

External links
 Texas 25 at Discogs

Texas (band) albums
2015 albums
PIAS Recordings albums